Millard Henry Alexander (born February 17, 1943, Boston, Massachusetts) is an American theoretical chemist. He is Distinguished University Professor at the University of Maryland, with appointments in the Department of Chemistry and Biochemistry and the Institute for Physical Science and Technology. He is the author of over 300 publications and an active researcher in the fields of molecular collision dynamics and theoretical chemistry.

Research
Alexander's research focus is the quantum-mechanical aspects of molecular collisions, in particular those involving open-shell species. More specifically, Alexander's work has focused on understanding chemical reactions where the Born–Oppenheimer approximation can be violated, by means of nonadiabatic coupling, spin–orbit interactions and conical intersections.

Organisational affiliations
Alexander is a fellow of the American Physical Society and of the American Association for the Advancement of Science and a  member of the International Academy of Quantum Molecular Science. In 2015 he received the Herschbach Medal for contributions to the theoretical study of the dynamics of molecular collisions.

Since 2012 Alexander has served as the President of the Telluride Science Research Center.

Selected publications
 .
 .
 .
 .
 .
 .

References

External links
 Millard Alexander's home page at the University of Maryland
 Hibridon program suite for inelastic scattering, photodissociation, and weakly-bound clusters
  

1943 births
Living people
Fellows of the American Physical Society
Members of the International Academy of Quantum Molecular Science
Harvard College alumni
Theoretical chemists
21st-century American chemists
University of Maryland, College Park faculty